What Goes Up is a 2009 American comedy-drama film starring Hilary Duff and Steve Coogan. 

What Goes Up may also refer to:

"What Goes Up" (short story), a 1956 science fiction short story by Arthur C. Clarke
"What Goes Up..." (The Batman), a 2008 episode from the fifth season of the animated television series
"What Goes Up..." (The Brady Bunch), a 1970 episode from the second season of the American sitcom
"What Goes Up..." (Bugs), a 1996 episode from the second season of the British television drama

See also
"What Goes Up Must Come Down," an episode of  the U.S. Claymation television series Bump in the Night.